Madden School, also known as North Lawrence Community Schools Administration Building, is a historic school building located at Bedford, Lawrence County, Indiana.  It was built in 1923, and is a two-story, rectangular, Classical Revival style limestone and brick building on a raised basement.  A three-room addition was built in 1925–1926.  It has dual front entrances and a parapet surrounding the roof.  The building housed a school until 1976, after which it was used as an administration center.

It was listed in the National Register of Historic Places in 2000.

References

School buildings on the National Register of Historic Places in Indiana
Neoclassical architecture in Indiana
School buildings completed in 1923
Buildings and structures in Lawrence County, Indiana
National Register of Historic Places in Lawrence County, Indiana
1923 establishments in Indiana